The men's 10,000 metres event at the 1967 Summer Universiade was held at the National Olympic Stadium in Tokyo on 30 August  1967. It was the first time that this event was contested at the Universiade.

Results

References

Athletics at the 1967 Summer Universiade
1967